Dea may be :

Zimakani language 
Ese language